Melanotus is a genus of click beetles in the family Elateridae. There are at least 30 described species in Melanotus.

Species

References

Further reading

 
 
 

Elaterinae